Miss World Panamá 2022 was the 9th Miss World Panamá pageant, to select Panama's representative to the Miss World pageant. 

Nineteen preliminary contestants were selected from all over Panama and competed for the crown. Miss World Panamá 2020 Krysthelle Barreto Reichlin of Panamá Centro crowned Kathleen Pérez Coffre of Bocas del Toro as her successor at the end of the event.

Kathleen Pérez Miss World Panamá 2022 will compete at Miss World 2022 pageant.

Final results

Special awards

Judges
 Ana Lucia Tejeira - Reina Hispanoamericana Panamá 2021.
 Virginia Hernández -Miss World Panamá 2013 & Miss Earth Panamá 2016.
 Algis Gonzalez - Mister World Panamá 2019.

Presentation Show 
This Presentation event was held on 17 February 2022 at the Teatro Pacific in Panama City, is the night when the nineteen finalists were selected from Miss World Panamá 2022 are presented to the public and press in the Evening gown and cocktail dress categories.

Challenge events

Top Model

Sports & Fitness

Talent

Beach Beauty

Creativity

Official Contestants 
These are the competitors who have been selected this year.

References

Señorita Panamá
2022 beauty pageants
2022 in Panama